Kherson Oblast, also known as Khersonshchyna, is an oblast (province) in southern Ukraine. It is located just north of Crimea. Its administrative center is Kherson, on the west bank of the Dnieper which bisects the oblast. The area of the region is 28,461 km2 and the population  It is considered the 'fruit basket' of the country, as much of its agricultural production is dispersed throughout the country, with production peaking during the summer months.

Most of the area of the oblast has been under Russian military occupation since the 2022 Russian invasion of Ukraine. Territory in the northwest, including Kherson city, was recaptured by Ukraine in the southern counteroffensive.

On 30 September 2022, Russia annexed the Donetsk (Donetsk People's Republic), Luhansk (Luhansk People's Republic), Zaporizhzhia, and Kherson Oblasts. However, the referendums and subsequent annexations are internationally unrecognized.

History

20th century
During the 1991 referendum, 90.13% of votes in Kherson Oblast were in favor of the Declaration of Independence of Ukraine.

21st century
A survey conducted in December 2014 by the Kyiv International Institute of Sociology found that 90.9% of the oblast's population opposed their region joining Russia, 1% did support the idea, and the rest were undecided or did not respond.

Russian invasion 

Since the 2022 Russian invasion of Ukraine began on 24 February, Russian forces have occupied most of the oblast, with government by the "Kherson military–civilian administration" from 28 April to 30 September.

On 27 July 2022 the Ukrainian army destroyed the Antonovsky Bridge, as part of its wider campaign to isolate the Russian 49th Combined Arms Army on the right bank of the Dnieper river. On 31 August it was reported that the defenders of the occupied Kherson territory were the 49th Combined Arms Army and what was left of the 35th Combined Arms Army.

On 5 September it was announced that the newly-installed Russian administration had postponed its plans to hold a referendum on the planned secession from Ukraine. The plebiscite had been scheduled to occur on 11 September, in order to coincide with the Russian electoral calendar. Due to the contestation of the oblast by the Ukrainian forces, it was found to be impractical to hold at this time. On 23–27 September 2022, the Russian Federation held referendums in the occupied territories of Kherson and Zaporizhzhia oblasts for "independence and subsequent entry into the Russian Federation", recognized by most states to be staged and against international law.

On September 29, the Russian Federation recognized Kherson Oblast as an independent state. On 30 September, Russian president Vladimir Putin announced the annexation of the Kherson Oblast and three other Ukrainian territories, and signed "accession decrees" that are widely considered to be illegal. At that time, Russia was not in control of the province as a whole. The United Nations General Assembly subsequently passed a resolution calling on countries not to recognise what it described as an "attempted illegal annexation" and demanded that Russia "immediately, completely and unconditionally withdraw".

On 9 November 2022, the city of Kherson and a remaining pocket of land on the right bank of the Dnieper were re-captured by Ukrainian forces. The territory on the left bank is still under Russian control.

Geography

Kherson Oblast is bordered by Dnipropetrovsk Oblast to the north, the Black Sea and Crimea to the south, Mykolaiv Oblast to the west, and the Azov Sea and Zaporizhzhia Oblast to the east. The Dnieper River, which includes the Kakhovka Reservoir, runs through the oblast.

Before the 2022 Russian invasion of Ukraine, two bridges spanned the Dniper: the Khakovsky Bridge near Nova Kakhovka and the Antonovsky Bridge at Kherson. Another significant bridge, the Daryivka Bridge crosses the Inhulets river and connects Kherson via the M14 highway to Beryslav, the other abutment of the Khakovsky Bridge.

The oblast's Henichesk Raion includes the northern portion of the Arabat Spit, a thin strip of land between the brackish Syvash and the Sea of Azov that is geographically part of the Crimean Peninsula. Due to Russia gaining de facto control of the Autonomous Republic of Crimea in 2014, this strip within Kherson Oblast was the only part of the Crimean Peninsula under Ukrainian control immediately prior to the 2022 Russian invasion of Ukraine.

Administrative divisions

Until the 2020 re-organisation, the Kherson Oblast was administratively subdivided into 18 raions (districts) and 3 municipalities. The municipalities – Kherson (administrative center of the oblast), Nova Kakhovka, and Kakhovka – were directly subordinate to the oblast government. The Kherson municipality was subdivided into 3 urban districts. All information below was current as of 2015.

.* Note: Though the administrative center of the raion is housed in the city/town that it is named after, cities do not answer to the raion authorities only towns do; instead they are directly subordinated to the oblast government and therefore are not counted as part of raion statistics.

At a lower level of administration, these district-level administrations are subdivided into:
 Settlements – 697, including:
 Villages – 658;
 Cities/Urban-type settlements – 36, including:
 Cities of raion subordinance – 4 (Beryslav, Henichesk, Skadovsk, Tavriisk, and Oleshky);
 Urban-type settlement – 30;
 Selsovets – 260.

The local administration of the oblast is controlled by the Kherson Oblast Rada. The governor of the oblast is the Kherson Oblast Rada speaker, appointed by the President of Ukraine.

Demographics

The population of the oblast is 1,083,367 (2012), which is 2.4% of the total population of Ukraine. It is also ranked 21st by its population. The population density is 38 per km2.

About 61.5% or 745,400 people live in urban areas of the Oblast and 38.5% or 467,600 people live in agricultural centers/villages. Men make up 46.7% or 565,400 people of the population, women make up 53.3% or 644,600 people, and pensioners make up 26.2% or 317,400 people of the Oblast population.

Ukrainian National Census (2001):
 Ukrainians – 82.0%
 Russians – 14.1%
 Belarusians – 0.7%
 Meskhetian Turks – 0.5%
 Crimean Tatars – 0.5%
 Others – 2.2%

Age structure
 0-14 years: 15.1%  (male 83,397/female 79,303)
 15-64 years: 70.5%  (male 364,907/female 393,933)
 65 years and over: 14.4%  (male 50,404/female 104,856) (2013 official)

Median age
 total: 39.5 years 
 male: 36.2 years 
 female: 42.7 years  (2013 official)

Public opinion
A 2014 survey by the Kyiv Institute of international Sociology found that 90% of the population opposes the idea of joining Russia, 1% supported the idea, and the rest was undecided or did not respond.

Attractions

Askania-Nova
Lake Lemuria
Legendary tachanka monument
Kurhan cemetery
Shovkunek Art museum
Saint Yekaterynian Temple

See also
 Subdivisions of Ukraine
 Kherson Governorate

References

External links

 Portal of Kherson
 Site of Kherson nationalists
 State Administration of Kherson Region – official site 
 Information Card of the Region – official site of the Cabinet of Ministers of Ukraine
 Promo-video about Kherson and South of Ukraine - official YouTube channel of The center of tourism and adventures "ХерсON"

 
Oblasts of Ukraine
1944 establishments in Ukraine
Ukrainian territories claimed by Russia